The ocean whitefish (Caulolatilus princeps), also known as the ocean tilefish, is a species of marine ray-finned fish, a tilefish belonging to the family Malacanthidae. It is native to the eastern Pacific Ocean.

Description
The ocean whitefish has a sturdy, quadrangular body with a relatively deep head which has a steep profile and a small mouth extending to the front of the eye. There is a fleshy ridge along the centreline of the body in front of the dorsal fin. The gill cover has a short blunt spine while the preoperculum is serrated. The dorsal fin contains between 7 and 10, normally 9, spines and 24-27 soft rays while the anal fin has 1-3 spines and 22-26 soft rays. The overall colour is pale brown with a white abdomen. The pectoral fins are coloured greenish-blue and yellow while the dorsal fin is yellow. This species can reach a length of  total length.

Distribution
The ocean whitefish is found in the eastern Pacific Ocean. Here it ranges from British Columbia south to central Peru. It is also found at almost all of the eastern Pacific archipelagos, except for Clipperton Island. It prefers warmer waters and is commonest on the banks and offshore islands of the coast of California, from Point Conception in Santa Barbara County south to Baja California in Mexico.

Habitat and biology
It is found mainly over rocky substrates, but may also be encountered on Sandy or muddy substrates too. This species has an extended spawning season which runs from the late autumn into early spring. The egg as and larvae are pelagic. They are sexually mature at 3-5 years old and May live for 13 years. It is a solitary species which shelters during the night in kelp or in rocky reefs. It is a predatory fish which has a diet comprising crabs, shrimp, large krill, squid, anchovies, and lanternfish. The ocean whitefish forages by digging into the substrate.

The predators of the ocean whitefish include the giant sea bass (Stereolepis gigas), school shark (Galeorhinus galeus) and California sea lion (Zalophus californianus). Known parasites include the trematodes Choanodera caulolatili, Choricotyle caulolatili, Jaliscia caballeroi and Myzotus vitellosus.

Systematics
The ocean whitefish was first formally described in 1840 as Latilus princeps by the English naturalist Leonard Jenyns (1800-1893). The type specimen was collected in the Galapagos by H.M.S. Beagle. The specific name princeps means “first” or “most important”, the reason for the name was not explained but maybe because it was larger than its presumed congeners at the time Jenyns named it.<ref name = ETYFish>{{cite web | url = https://etyfish.org/eupercaria/ | title =Series EUPERCARIA (Incertae sedis): Families CALLANTHIIDAE, CENTROGENYIDAE, DINOLESTIDAE, DINOPERCIDAE, EMMELICHTHYIDAE, MALACANTHIDAE, MONODACTYLIDAE, MORONIDAE, PARASCORPIDIDAE, SCIAENIDAE and SILLAGINIDAE | work = The ETYFish Project Fish Name Etymology Database | accessdate = 11 March 2021 | date = 18 September 2020 | author1 = Christopher Scharpf | author2 = Kenneth J. Lazara | name-list-style = amp | publisher = Christopher Scharpf and Kenneth J. Lazara}}</ref> Hubbs’s tilefish (Caulolatilus hubbsi) was described as a new species from the Galápagos Islands in 1978 but since then studies have shown that it is not readily distinguishable from C. princeps'' and should be considered a junior synonym of this species.

Utilisation
The ocean whitefish is caught as bycatch off California by the groundfish fishery using hook and line. It is also a popular fish for sport fishing.

References

External links
 

Ocean whitefish
Fish described in 1840